Sammarinese are citizens and people of the Republic of San Marino.

Language
San Marino recognizes Italian as the official language. The indigenous language, known as Sammarinese, is a variety of Romagnol spoken by approximately 83 percent of the population.

Religion
Although historically San Marino fought against the political control of the Holy See, most Sammarinese people are Catholic, but there is no state religion. Many of San Marino's official ceremonies are held in the Basilica di San Marino, the republic's main church, or in other churches. There are a total of nine Catholic parishes all of which comprise the Diocese of San Marino-Montefeltro.

References

Demonyms
Ethnic groups in San Marino